Bilal Zafar (born October 16, 1991) is a British comedian who won the New Act of The Year Award (NATY) in 2016 and was nominated for Best Newcomer at the Edinburgh Comedy Awards in the same year. He has written for The Independent and The Guardian.

Personal life
Zafar is from Wanstead, London, and he studied at Wanstead High School before moving to Manchester to study screenwriting at The University of Bolton. He worked part-time as a concierge and a care assistant while living in Manchester. Zafar moved back to London in January 2016.

Career
Zafar began performing stand-up comedy in his final year of university in 2013 and is best known for performing material about racism and islamophobia. He cites Simon Amstell and Chris Morris as influences.

In 2015, Zafar was runner-up in the New Comedian of the Year competition run by Leicester Square Theatre. The following year he won first prize at the NATYS Awards in London at the same venue.

Described as a "wry storyteller", Zafar appeared on the BBC Asian Network's Comedy Show in 2016 and 2017. He has also appeared on BBC Radio Four's Loose Ends and presented one of the station's Stand-Up Specials.

Zafar is now a Twitch partner, creating Pro Evolution Soccer 5 based content as well as numerous 'Dis-tracks' targeted at Scottish streamer 'McGurgle'.

External links

Bilal Zafar on IMDb

References

Living people
1991 births
English stand-up comedians
English male comedians
Muslim male comedians
Comedians from London
People from Wanstead
Alumni of the University of Bolton